Upper Partridge Lake is a fresh water lake in the Lake Ontario drainage basin in the Cashel portion of the township of Tudor and Cashel, Hastings County, Ontario, Canada.

Hydrology
The primary inflow is Partridge Creek from an unnamed lake at the north. The primary outflow is also Partridge Creek, south towards Grimsthorpe Lake, which eventually flows via the Skootamatta River and Moira River to the Bay of Quinte on Lake Ontario.

References

Lakes of Hastings County